Giona Cividino (born 5 June 1974) is an Italian bobsledder. He competed in the four man event at the 2002 Winter Olympics.

References

External links
 

1974 births
Living people
Italian male bobsledders
Olympic bobsledders of Italy
Bobsledders at the 2002 Winter Olympics
People from San Daniele del Friuli
Sportspeople from Friuli-Venezia Giulia